The 2016–17 Rutgers Scarlet Knights women's basketball team will represent Rutgers University during the 2016–17 NCAA Division I women's basketball season. The Scarlet Knights, led by twenty-second year head coach C. Vivian Stringer, play their home games at the Louis Brown Athletic Center, better known as The RAC, as third year members of the Big Ten Conference. They finished the season 6–24, 3–13 in Big Ten play to finish in a 4 way for eleventh place. They lost in the first round of the Big Ten women's tournament to Wisconsin.

Roster

Schedule

|-
!colspan=9 style="background:#CC0000; color:#FFFFFF;"| Non-conference regular season

|-
!colspan=9 style="background:#CC0000; color:#FFFFFF;"| Big Ten regular season

|-
!colspan=9 style="background:#CC0000; color:#000000;"| Big Ten Women's Tournament

See also
2016–17 Rutgers Scarlet Knights men's basketball team

References

Rutgers Scarlet Knights women's basketball seasons
Rutgers
Rutgers
Rutgers